The United States has more than 20 container ports around its coastline.

Global supply chain disruption

The supply chains that were disrupted during the COVID-19 pandemic faced huge challenges and struggled to recover. Industries around the world shutdown due to the rapid spread of the virus in 2020. There was reduced industrial activity and lower consumer demand. While consumer demand increased quickly when lockdowns were lifted, manufacturers and distributors of goods were stymied by worker shortages and a lack of key components and raw materials. Additional bottlenecks included containers, shipping, trucks, railroads and warehouses. Ports around the world were impacted with ports in the United States in particular experiencing blockages as they were overwhelmed with container ships and their cargo. The ports of Long Beach and Los Angeles together account for approximately 40% of the shipping containers entering the United States. More than three-quarters of the containers leaving Los Angeles were empty in July 2021 whereas about two-thirds of the containers leaving U.S. ports are typically filled with exports. Many of containers were going back empty due to the rush by shippers to bring in imports of back-to-school supplies and fall fashions from Asia. This impacted Midwestern farmers and California almond growers who ship to customers overseas. Shipping companies placed a lower priority on products that paid lower shipping rates resulting in various exports being delayed. In October, there were a record number of ships at the docks of these two Los Angeles area ports as well a record number of ships waiting for a slip. In early November, more than 100 ships were anchored in San Pedro Bay. It was unusual for even one vessel to be waiting offshore before the coronavirus pandemic. In late 2021 and the first month of 2022, container ships have remained at American ports unloading goods for seven days on average, 21 percent higher than at the start of the pandemic. The mayhem at ports and shipping yards was a key driver for rising prices together with the market dominance of major companies. In early 2022, politicians and central bankers worked to tame inflation as businesses continued to struggle to manufacture and distribute their products. By July the total value of trade stuck on the water off the east and west coast ports was estimated at roughly $30 billion. Another $1.5 billion in trade was waiting for rail service at the Ports of Long Beach and Los Angeles which was 60% of all containers waiting at these ports. By September 2022, the backlog at U.S. ports decreased partially due to slowing U.S. import volumes amid high inflation and rising interest rates.

West Coast

Gulf of Mexico

East Coast 

Dredging of east coast ports are under way because of the New Panama Canal expansion and the expectation of  larger container ships.

The Jasper Ocean Terminal is a planned container terminal to be built on the Savannah River downstream of Savannah, GA that is expected to begin operations in the mid 2020s.

See also

 List of ports of the United States ranked by tonnage
 Container on barge on the Mississippi and tributaries
 List of world's busiest container ports

References

Further reading 
U.S. Port and Inland Waterways Modernization: Preparing for Post-Panamax Vessel, U.S. Army Corps of Engineers, June 20, 2012

External links

Lists of ports
Container terminals
Intermodal containers